Goślina may refer to the following places in Poland:

Długa Goślina
Murowana Goślina